Brac Systems, Inc assets were acquired by Greyter Water Systems in May 2012. Brac was a company that specialized in the development of water saving products for both residential and commercial use. Brac Systems Inc. was founded by Dennis Yasar in Montreal, Quebec, in February 2005.

Brac Systems began with the development of the GRS greywater recycling systems in 2005. Later, it manufactured and marketed greywater, rainwater and blackwater recycling systems. Brac's residential greywater recycling systems (RGW Systems) capture greywater from the showers, bathtubs, lavatories and laundry washing machines after which it's redistributed to the toilets or used for irrigation. Based upon statistics from Environment Canada, the company asserted that the use of their system will cut the average home's water consumption and sewage effluent by approximately one third.

In 2007, Brac Systems was named the Best New Product in the Energy Efficiency category at Mécanex/Climatex 2007, an annual plumbing and mechanical trade show held in Montreal. Brac's recycling system was also named one of the "Top Ten Green Building Products of 2007" by Sustainable Industries Journal, a publication for the green building industry.

Brac's greywater and rainwater assets were purchased by Greyter Water Systems in 2012. Greyter advanced Brac's commercial buildings technology which has been sold to customers such as the US and Canadian military and the Ontario Ministry of Education.

News articles

External links
 Greyter Systems company website.

See also
Reclaimed water

References

Manufacturing companies based in Montreal